Stuart Colman (1848 – 1 September 1941) was an architect based in Bristol and London, England

Family
He was born in 1848 in Llandaff, Glamorgan, Wales, the son of Charles Frederick Colman (1816–1887) and Mary Elizabeth Mill (1824–1913).

He was educated at the Southampton School of Art.

He married Sarah Elizabeth Watson on 29 February 1876 at the Effra Road Unitarian Chapel, Brixton and they had the following children:
Evelyn Ruth Colman (1877–1927)
Stuart Mill Colman (1878–1963)
David Robert Colman (b. 1879)
Harry Mill Colman (1881–1966)
Alan Colman (1883–1928)
Edna Marion H Colman (b. 1886)

He was based in Bristol at 5 Unity Street.

He died on 1 September 1941 at 28 Sherwood Road, Forest Town, Johannesburg, South Africa.

New buildings

References

19th-century English architects
Architects from Bristol
People from Llandaff
1848 births
1941 deaths